Hohe Brach is a mountain of Baden-Württemberg, Germany.

Mountains and hills of Baden-Württemberg
Mainhardt Forest